Barboni is a surname. Notable people with the surname include:

Enzo Barboni (1922–2002), Italian film director, cinematographer, and screenwriter
Jean-Pierre Barboni (born 1958), retired Luxembourgian football midfielder
Leonida Barboni (1909–1970), Italian film cinematographer
Vincenzo Barboni (1802–1859), Italian painter